Shane Roiser is a former rugby union player with London Wasps whom he joined in 1994 from Rosslyn Park. Whilst at Wasps he helped them win the Anglo-Welsh Cup in 2000.

He was educated at Cumnor House School, Croydon
 and Trinity School of John Whitgift.

He qualified as a dentist before playing rugby full-time where he represented England at Student, Development and U21 levels.

His contract at London Wasps ended in 2004.  After Wasps he played for Blackheath Rugby Club.

On retiring from the professional game, he returned to his profession as a dentist in Oxhey, near Watford, Hertfordshire. He still plays in the occasional match for charity.

References

External links
Former rugby star and dentist 'No Pain Shane' takes on village practice

Black British sportspeople
Living people
Wasps RFC players
Rosslyn Park F.C. players
Year of birth missing (living people)